José António Tavares dos Anjos is a journalist, historian, genealogist and former National Park Service employee at Lowell National Historical Park and the St. Gaudens National Historic Site.

References

Living people
Cape Verdean journalists
Year of birth missing (living people)